Classic Gold Digital Network was one of the biggest 'gold' (oldies) formatted radio networks in the United Kingdom, with a potential audience of 47 million. Classic Gold was broadcast on analogue and DAB digital platforms, as well as Sky channel 0189. The first stations were launched in 1988; the network grew to 18 stations and was merged into what became the Gold network in 2007.

History
Most of the stations were originally the medium wave services of Independent Local Radio stations. For example, "Classic Gold 1359" in Coventry was originally part of Mercia Sound and was a full local service. In the 1980s, FM/AM stations split (in this case to Mercia FM and Xtra AM), before the station was bought by GWR radio in 1993, and the AM station rebranded to "Classic Gold". 

In 1998, Classic Gold in Northampton legally rebranded to Classic Gold 1557 Northamptonshire.

The stations were sold to UBC in two tranches in 2000 and 2002; however, in 2007 they came back under the control of GCap (formerly GWR & Capital). Most stations in the network carried the same programming, except for a local 4-hour afternoon programme from 3pm to 7pm.

Additionally, the AM service operated by UTV Radio in West Yorkshire, Pulse Classic Gold, carried programming supplied by the Classic Gold network (with additional localisation and programmes), although it was not owned by UBC.

In summer 2007, GCap Media agreed to acquire the 18 AM Classic Gold radio stations owned by Classic Gold Digital for a cash consideration of £3.95 million. GCap merged the network with its own Capital Gold network of stations to form one classic hits network. The acquisition, which included relevant DAB digital licences held by Classic Gold, was approved by Ofcom. The new network rebranded as 'Gold' launched at 7pm on Friday 3 August 2007.

Programmes

Weekdays
 Classic Gold's Even Tastier Breakfast with Tony Blackburn and Laura Frey 
 The Morning Show with Graham Rogers
 The Afternoon Show with Paul Burnett
 Classic Gold Drivetime (local opt-out programme)
 Classic Gold Evening Show with Paul Baker
 Classic Gold Late Night with Tim Allen
 The Overnight Express with Matthew Hardy

Weekends included
 The Retro Countdown with Mark Dennison
 Classic Gold Albums with Trevor Dann
 Neil Sean's Star People
 Saturday Night At The Movies with Steve Springett
 ''The Essential Tony Blackburn

Presenters
 Laura Frey
 Paul Burnett
 Gary Crowley
 Trevor Dann

Past presenters

 Tony Blackburn
 Jimmy Savile (deceased)
 Dave Lee Travis
 Johnnie Walker
 Mike Read
 Noddy Holder (from Slade)
 David Hamilton
 Simon Bates
 Emperor Rosko
 Chris Hawkins
 John Suchet

Regional stations
These were the 20 stations in the Classic Gold Digital Network on 3 August 2007:

 Classic Gold 1152, Plymouth
 Classic Gold 1260, Bristol and Bath
 Classic Gold 1332, Peterborough
 Classic Gold 1359, Coventry and Warwickshire
 Classic Gold 1359/1431, Essex
 Classic Gold 1431/1485, Reading
 Classic Gold 1521, Reigate and Crawley
 Classic Gold 1557, Northampton
 Classic Gold 666/954, Exeter and Torbay
 Classic Gold 774, Gloucester
 Classic Gold 828, Bournemouth
 Classic Gold 828/792, Hertfordshire, Bedfordshire, Buckinghamshire and Cambridgeshire
 Classic Gold 936/1161, Swindon and West Wiltshire
 Classic Gold 990/1017, Wolverhampton, Shrewsbury and Telford
 Classic Gold Amber, Norfolk and north Suffolk
 Classic Gold Amber, Ipswich and Bury St Edmunds
 Classic Gold Digital: Humberside, Lancashire, Leeds, London, Merseyside, Sheffield, Teesside, & Tyne & Wear on DAB; it also broadcast on Sky Digital Channel 0189
 Classic Gold GEM, Nottingham and Derby
 Classic Gold Marcher, Wrexham and Chester

In addition, until 1 December 2008, the UTV Radio-owned Pulse Classic Gold in West Yorkshire broadcast programming supplied by the network, with additional localisation and programmes specific to West Yorkshire. This station relaunched as Pulse 2, a completely local station before closing in August 2020 to become Greatest Hits Radio West Yorkshire.

References

External links
Official website, archived on 2 January 2007

GCap Media
Defunct radio stations in the United Kingdom
Former British radio networks
Radio stations established in 1989 
Radio_stations_disestablished_in_2007